Robert Guy Choquette  (April 22, 1905 – January 22, 1991) was a Canadian novelist, poet and diplomat.

He was born in Manchester, New Hampshire, and he moved with his family to Montreal in 1914.

In 1968, he was appointed Canada's ambassador to Paraguay, Uruguay, and Argentina. He served until 1970.

In 1968, he was made a Companion of the Order of Canada. In 1989, he was made a Grand Officer of the National Order of Quebec.

After his death in 1991, he was entombed at the Notre Dame des Neiges Cemetery in Montreal.

References

External links
 Robert Choquette  at The Canadian Encyclopedia

1905 births
1991 deaths
American emigrants to Canada
20th-century Canadian poets
20th-century Canadian male writers
Canadian male poets
Canadian male novelists
Companions of the Order of Canada
Grand Officers of the National Order of Quebec
Writers from Montreal
Writers from Manchester, New Hampshire
Ambassadors of Canada to Argentina
Ambassadors of Canada to Paraguay
Ambassadors of Canada to Uruguay
Canadian poets in French
20th-century Canadian novelists
Canadian novelists in French
Burials at Notre Dame des Neiges Cemetery